Louis Terrenoire (10 November 1908 – 9 January 1992) was a French politician from Union for the New Republic. He was Member of Parliament for Orne's 1st constituency and served as Minister of Information between 1960 and 1961.

Personal life 
His son Alain Terrenoire is also a politician.

References 

1908 births
1992 deaths
Deputies of the 1st National Assembly of the French Fifth Republic
Deputies of the 2nd National Assembly of the French Fifth Republic
Deputies of the 4th National Assembly of the French Fifth Republic
Deputies of the 3rd National Assembly of the French Fifth Republic
Ministers of Information of France
Dachau concentration camp survivors
20th-century French politicians
Union of Democrats for the Republic politicians
Union for the New Republic politicians
20th-century French journalists
Popular Republican Movement politicians
Members of Parliament for Orne
French Resistance members